Ângelo Pelegrinelli Neto (born 2 September 1991) is a Brazilian footballer who plays as a midfielder for Portuguese club Casa Pia.

Honours
Moreirense
Taça da Liga: 2016–17

References

1991 births
Footballers from São Paulo (state)
Living people
Brazilian footballers
Association football midfielders
Grêmio Barueri Futebol players
Iraty Sport Club players
Clube Atlético Linense players
Clube Atlético Penapolense players
América Futebol Clube (RN) players
Associação Desportiva São Caetano players
Moreirense F.C. players
Al-Fayha FC players
Esporte Clube Juventude players
Casa Pia A.C. players
Campeonato Brasileiro Série A players
Campeonato Paranaense players
Campeonato Brasileiro Série D players
Campeonato Brasileiro Série B players
Primeira Liga players
Saudi Professional League players
Liga Portugal 2 players
Brazilian expatriate footballers
Expatriate footballers in Portugal
Expatriate footballers in Saudi Arabia
Brazilian expatriate sportspeople in Portugal
Brazilian expatriate sportspeople in Saudi Arabia